Mürşide Ermumcu Anadolu Öğretmen Lisesi (MEAÖL, Mürşide Ermumcu Anatolian Teacher Training High School) is a teacher training high school within the Süleyman Demirel Education Complex located in Isparta, Turkey. Mürşide Ermumcu is the donor of the school, which was named after her.

Murside Ermumcu Anadolu Ogretmen Lisesi
Educational institutions established in 1993
1993 establishments in Turkey
Education in Isparta
Anatolian High Schools